The Hamilton County Courthouse in Chattanooga, Tennessee, designed by architect R.H. Hunt, was constructed in 1912. It was listed on the National Register of Historic Places in 1978.

It is three stories upon a basement.

A statue of Confederate general Alexander P. Stewart was unveiled on the courthouse grounds on April 22, 1919 by the United Daughters of the Confederacy.

References

External links

County courthouses in Tennessee
National Register of Historic Places in Hamilton County, Tennessee
Neoclassical architecture in Tennessee
Government buildings completed in 1912